The men's 10,000 metres at the 2022 European Athletics Championships took place at the Olympiastadion on 21 August.

Records

Schedule

Results
The race was started at 21:00.

References

10,000 M
10,000 metres at the European Athletics Championships